Jefferson - Vassie D. Wright Memorial Branch Library is a branch library of the Los Angeles Public Library in the Jefferson Park neighborhood of Los Angeles, California.  It was built in 1923 based on a Spanish Colonial Revival design by architect C.E. Noerenberg.

In 1987, the Jefferson Branch and several other branch libraries in Los Angeles were added to the National Register of Historic Places as part of a thematic group submission.   The application noted that the branch libraries had been constructed in a variety of period revival styles to house the initial branch library system of the City of Los Angeles.

See also

List of Registered Historic Places in Los Angeles
Los Angeles Public Library

References

External links
 Jefferson - Vassie D. Wright Memorial Branch Library - Los Angeles Public Library
 Jefferson Branch Library history, 1936
 Highlights of the Jefferson Branch Library history 1912-1985, 1985
 Dedication ceremonies, Jefferson Branch Library-Vassie D. Wright Memorial, Jun. 6, 1985
 Newspaper article, "Library named for Vassie D. Wright: Black historian," Feb. 28, 1985

Library buildings completed in 1923
Libraries in Los Angeles
Libraries on the National Register of Historic Places in Los Angeles
Jefferson Park, Los Angeles
1923 establishments in California